Peripsychoda is a genus of flies belonging to the family Psychodidae.

Distribution
The species of this genus are found in Europe, Asia and Australia.

Species
Peripsychoda adusta (Quate & Quate, 1967)
Peripsychoda agrestis (Quate & Quate, 1967)
Peripsychoda ambalata (Quate & Quate, 1967)
Peripsychoda appendiculata (Quate & Quate, 1967)
Peripsychoda aurasica (Vaillant, 1958)
Peripsychoda auriculata (Haliday, 1839)
Peripsychoda baitabagensis (Quate & Quate, 1967)
Peripsychoda bulbula (Quate & Quate, 1967)
Peripsychoda castanea (Quate & Quate, 1967)
Peripsychoda centraceps (Quate & Quate, 1967)
Peripsychoda clavicula (Quate, 1962)
Peripsychoda confraga (Quate & Quate, 1967)
Peripsychoda cracenta (Quate & Quate, 1967)
Peripsychoda crassepalpis (Satchell, 1953)
Peripsychoda dimorpha (Tonnoir, 1953)
Peripsychoda empheres (Quate & Quate, 1967)
Peripsychoda festiva (Satchell, 1953)
Peripsychoda fragilis (Quate & Quate, 1967)
Peripsychoda fusca (Macquart, 1826)
Peripsychoda globalaris (Quate & Quate, 1967)
Peripsychoda gregsoni (Tonnoir, 1953)
Peripsychoda hirsuta (Quate & Quate, 1967)
Peripsychoda iranica Ježek, 1987
Peripsychoda kratkensis (Quate & Quate, 1967)
Peripsychoda lippa (Quate & Quate, 1967)
Peripsychoda lobella (Quate & Quate, 1967)
Peripsychoda longicera (Quate & Quate, 1967)
Peripsychoda longipalpi Ipe, Ipe & Kishore, 1986
Peripsychoda nicholsoni (Satchell, 1953)
Peripsychoda nigritarsis Enderlein, 1937
Peripsychoda obscura (Satchell, 1953)
Peripsychoda obtusalata (Quate & Quate, 1967)
Peripsychoda pholidotes (Quate, 1962)
Peripsychoda ramosa (Quate, 1962)
Peripsychoda reburra (Quate & Quate, 1967)
Peripsychoda repanda (Quate & Quate, 1967)
Peripsychoda scarificata (Quate & Quate, 1967)
Peripsychoda sisypha (Quate & Quate, 1967)
Peripsychoda slenderstyli Ipe, Ipe & Kishore, 1986
Peripsychoda spuriosa (Quate & Quate, 1967)
Peripsychoda tridentata (Quate & Quate, 1967)
Peripsychoda viduata (Tonnoir, 1953)
Peripsychoda wauensis (Quate & Quate, 1967)
Peripsychoda zangherii Sarà, 1952
Peripsychoda zbytka Ježek, 2004
Peripsychoda zygops (Quate & Quate, 1967)

References

Nematocera genera
Diptera of Asia
Diptera of Europe
Diptera of Australasia
Psychodidae
Taxa named by Günther Enderlein